This page deals with a city in Ukraine. For the film named after this city, see Luboml (film).

It serves as the administrative center of Liuboml urban hromada (district). Population:

Overview
Because of its strategic location at the crossroads of Central and Eastern Europe, Liuboml had a long history of changing rule, dating back to the 11th century. The territory of Volhynia first belonged to Kyivan Rus', then to the Kingdom of Poland, the Polish–Lithuanian Commonwealth, the Russian Empire, interwar Poland, the USSR, and finally to sovereign Ukraine.

History

The settlement was first mentioned in written documents from the 13th century.

Until the Russian Revolution of 1917, it was a settlement in Vladimir-Volynsky Uyezd of Volhynian Governorate of the Russian Empire; from 1921 to September 1939 it was an administrative centre of an urban county in the Wołyń Voivodeship of Poland.

A local newspaper is published here since 1939.

Before the ensuing Holocaust, Luboml was a town with the highest percentage of Jews anywhere in the country by 1931, exceeding 94% of the total population of over 3,300 people.

In Yiddish, the town was called Libivne. During World War II, Liuboml was occupied twice. It remained under the German occupation from 25 June 1941 until 19 July 1944 in the years following the anti-Soviet Operation Barbarossa. It was administered as a part of the Nazi German Reichskommissariat Ukraine. The entire Jewish community of Liuboml was annihilated in a mass shooting action conducted in 1942 on the outskirts of town in the deadliest phase of the Holocaust. The town's Jews along with refugees from western Poland estimated at around 4,500 people, were taken by the German Einsatzgruppen aided by the local Ukrainian collaborators and Auxiliary Police to nearby pits and shot. There were 51 known survivors from the virtually eradicated town. Liuboml was repopulated during the postwar repatriations.

In January 1989 the population was 10 124 people.

Historical and Cultural Heritage Monuments
The town's landmarks include St. George's Church, built in the 16th century in place of a 13th-century Orthodox church which previously occupied the site, and the Trinity Church, which goes back to 1412, but was subsequently rebuilt, with a belfry from 1640. Prior to Second World War, the grand synagogue was a dominant landmark as well, before its meticulous destruction.

Gallery

See also
 Luboml: My Heart Remembers, a documentary film that describes Jewish life in Liuboml between the two World Wars and mourns the town's Jewish population, lost during World War II.
 Sonia Orbuch A Jewish resistance fighter from Lubom

References

  Luboml.org website in remembrance of the vanished Jewish community.

Cities in Volyn Oblast
Ruthenian Voivodeship
Volhynian Governorate
Wołyń Voivodeship (1921–1939)
Shtetls
Cities of district significance in Ukraine
Holocaust locations in Ukraine